Some Mistakes You Never Stop Paying For is an album from Boston, Massachusetts, hardcore punk band, The Suicide File. It was released in February 2005 on Indecision Records. The LP is a compilation of songs from the band's demo, two EPs, and several split EPs.

Track listing
"2003" – 1:46      
"Fuck Fox News" – 1:44      
"I Like the Nightlife Baby" – 2:07      
"Cold Snap" – 1:50      
"Things Fall Apart" – 2:00      
"Achtung! Landmine!" – 1:16      
"Some Mistakes You Never Stop Paying For" – 2:45      
"Ashcroft" – 1:36      
"I Hate Rock N' Roll" – 1:04      
"Purple Dawn" – 0:36      
"Now Lie in It" – 1:22      
"Kissinger" – 1:24      
"Somme" – 1:26      
"I Hate You" – 2:39      
"Pleasure to Have in Class" – 2:26      
"Kissinger" – 1:24      
"I Hate You" – 3:13      
"Another Night in America" – 1:58

Tracks 1-5 originally appeared on the "Things Fall Apart" EP.
Tracks 6-7 originally appeared on the split EP with R'N'R.
Tracks 8-9 originally appeared on the split EP with The Hope Conspiracy.
Tracks 10-15 originally appeared on "The Suicide File" EP.
Tracks 16-18 originally appeared on the band's demo.

Credits
 Dave Weinberg – vocals
 Neeraj Kane – guitar
 Jason C. – guitar
 John Carpenter – bass
 Jarrod Alexander – drums
 Jimmy Carroll – guitar
 Recorded 2001 – 2003 at The Outpost, Stoughton, Massachusetts and Atomic Recording Studio, Brooklyn, New York, US
 Produced by Jim Siegel
 Engineered by Jim Siegel, Kurt Ballou, and Dean Baltulonis

External links
 Indecision Records album page
 [ Allmusic Guide album entry]

2005 compilation albums
The Suicide File albums
Indecision Records compilation albums